Kalapani is a village in the Bhopal district of Madhya Pradesh, India. It is located in the Huzur tehsil, beside Kolar road. The Kathotiya hiking area is located near Kalapani.

Demographics 

According to the 2011 census of India, Kalapani has 567 households. The effective literacy rate (i.e. the literacy rate of population excluding children aged 6 and below) is 46.82%.

References 

Villages in Huzur tehsil